Leptanillini is a tribe of Leptanillinae ants with three extant genera.

Genera
 Leptanilla Emery, 1870
 Phaulomyrma G.C. Wheeler & E.W. Wheeler, 1930
 Yavnella Kugler, 1987

References

Leptanillinae
Ant tribes